Indrapura may refer to:

 Indrapura (Champa), capital city of the Champa Kingdom in the 9th century A.D.
 the old name of Pahang, a state in Malaysia
 Siak Sri Indrapura, a town in Riau province of Indonesia, former capital of subsequent Islamic kingdoms and sultanates
 the ancient name of Indore, the largest city and the commercial capital of the Indian state of Madhya Pradesh
 Indrapura (Khmer), the first capital city of Khmer king Jayavarman II
 Indrapura (play), a 2006 play
 An old name of Mount Kerinci, a volcano on Sumatra

See also
 Indraprastha, ancient Indian city in Delhi